Cycling was contested at the 2006 Asian Games in Doha, Qatar. Road bicycle racing was held at the Cycling Street Circuit and the Al-Khor Circuit from December 3 to December 6, while Track cycling was contested at Aspire Hall 1 from December 9 to December 14.  Both disciplines included competition for both men and women.

Schedule

Medalists

Road

Men

Women

Track

Men

Women

Medal table

Participating nations
A total of 211 athletes from 26 nations competed in cycling at the 2006 Asian Games:

References

External links
 Official website – Track cycling
 Official website – Road cycling

 
2006 Asian Games events
2002
Asian Games
2002 Asian Games